Canarian Wrestling is a form of folk wrestling, originally from the Canary Islands, where it is known as .

Description
Wrestlers start in the middle of a sand circle, called . The aim is to make their opponent touch the sand with any part of their body, except the feet. To accomplish this, they use different techniques called  to throw their opponent off balance. Two falls are required to win a bout. A match ends when all the members of one team have been defeated.

History
Canarian wrestling comes from the history of the Guanches, the earliest known natives of the Canary Islands, although with limited contact between the islands, each island then developed different rules.
  
Only some of these early rules and techniques have survived to modern times. After the conquest, the sport became part of the islands’ folklore, only usually being fought at celebrations or local festivals.

  
The rules were first laid down in 1872, making it one of the earliest defined forms of wrestling. As it needs a sand circle,  is usually fought on special pitches, and important matches, particularly inter-island contests, are covered by local Canarian TV.

Techniques
, moves, or series of moves, can be divided in three groups. Punching, hitting and strangling is not permitted.

 Grasping: The wrestler may grasp any part of the opponent's body to try to un-balance and knock down the opponent.
 Block: The wrestler can block a move by his opponent, and use his strength to un-balance his opponent.
 Deflect: The wrestler can move his body to deflect a move by his opponent, and use the opponent's strength to un-balance him.

References 
 Página oficial de la Federación de Lucha Canaria (En español) Consultado el 4 de enero de 2008
 Página oficial de la Red Social de la Lucha Canaria ,Deporte Vernaculo de las Islas Canarias, Noticias de Lucha Canaria. 

Sport in the Canary Islands
Canarian culture
Folk wrestling styles
Sports originating in Spain
European martial arts